Hardwick is a small village in North Northamptonshire, England, close to the town of Wellingborough. The population is included in the civil parish of Great Harrowden.

The village's name means "herd farm".

Gallery

References

External links

Villages in Northamptonshire
North Northamptonshire
Civil parishes in Northamptonshire